Daphnella nobilis is a species of sea snail, a marine gastropod mollusk in the family Raphitomidae.

Description
The length of the shell varies between 15 mm and 27 mm.

Distribution
This marine species occurs off the Philippines and Japan.

References

 Kira, Tetsuaki. Genshoku Nihon kairui zukan: Coloured illustrations of the shells of Japan. Vol. 4. Hoikusha, 1959.

External links
 
 Gastropods.com: Daphnella (Daphnella) nobilis

nobilis
Gastropods described in 1959